John Curtis Gilmore (April 18, 1837 – December 22, 1922) was an American soldier who fought in the American Civil War. He received his country's highest award for bravery during combat, the Medal of Honor. Gilmore's medal was won for capturing the flag and rallying the spirits of the troops under his command during the Second Battle of Fredericksburg on May 3, 1863. He was honored with the award on October 10, 1892.

Gilmore was born in Canada and was commissioned as a Captain in May 1861. He was promoted to Major in September 1862 and mustered out in 1863. He rejoined the Army in 1865 and rose to the rank of Brigadier general before retiring on his 64th birthday in 1901.  He was a companion of the District of Columbia Commandery of the Military Order of the Loyal Legion of the United States.  He was buried in Arlington National Cemetery.

Medal of Honor citation

See also
List of American Civil War Medal of Honor recipients: G–L

References

Links 
 John Curtis Gilmore

1837 births
1922 deaths
American Civil War recipients of the Medal of Honor
Burials at Arlington National Cemetery
Pre-Confederation Canadian emigrants to the United States
Canadian-born Medal of Honor recipients
People of New York (state) in the American Civil War
Union Army officers
United States Army Medal of Honor recipients